Yasyri is a rural locality (a village) in Savinskoye Rural Settlement, Permsky District, Perm Krai, Russia. The population was 360 as of 2010. There are 7 streets.

Geography 
Yasyri is located 17 km southwest of Perm (the district's administrative centre) by road. Vanyuki is the nearest rural locality.

References 

Rural localities in Permsky District